Bosea cypria is a species of flowering plant in the Amaranthaceae family. It is a highly branched, evergreen shrub, 1–2 m high, erect, suberect, or hanging on walls, cliffs or trees, with hairless angular shoots. Leaves, opposite, simple, entire-+ elliptical, 2-6 x  (1-2-3) cm, hairless, petiolate, dark green, occasionally red green. Flowers in branched spikes, hermaphrodite or unisexual 5-merous, very small, green brown, the floral symmetry is actinomorphic. The fruit is a globose red berry. Flowers from April to July. It is endemic to Cyprus and in the local Greek Cypriot dialect it is called 

Habitat
It grows on rocky limestone banks, cliffs, old walls or gulleys, from sea level to 600 m.

Distribution
Endemic to Cyprus. Akamas (Avakas, Kouphes etc.), Kritou Terra, Peyia, Lysos, Theletra, Mesoyi, Kato Paphos, Pakhyammos, Episkopi, Limassol, Potamos Liopetriou, Protaras, Dhiorios, Pentadaktylos, Rizokarpaso.

Cultivation
It has mostly been planted in hedges.

Gallery

References

External links
 http://www.treknature.com/gallery/photo281484.htm
 https://www.flickr.com/photos/wildlifetravel/8200940920/
 http://www.natureofcyprus.org/detailinfo.aspx?cid=5&recid=205&rowid=51&rowcount=1&pageindex=10&pagesize=5
 http://www.theplantlist.org/tpl/record/kew-2680382
 https://web.archive.org/web/20140201145132/http://www.wsl.ch/dendro/xylemdb/index.php?TEXTID=764&MOD=1
 http://www.herbaryum.neu.edu.tr/content/resimler/Amaranthaceae/Bosea cypria.JPG
 

Amaranthaceae
Endemic flora of Cyprus
Taxa named by Pierre Edmond Boissier
Taxa named by Joseph Dalton Hooker